Scolioplecta is a genus of moths belonging to the subfamily Tortricinae of the family Tortricidae.

Species
Scolioplecta allocotus Common, 1965
Scolioplecta araea Turner, 1916
Scolioplecta comptana (Walker, 1863)
Scolioplecta exochus Common, 1965
Scolioplecta molybdantha Meyrick, 1910
Scolioplecta ochrophylla Turner, 1916
Scolioplecta rigida (Meyrick, 1910)

See also
List of Tortricidae genera

References

External links
tortricidae.com

Phricanthini
Tortricidae genera